The Rajpath or Rajkot BRTS is a bus rapid transit system in Rajkot, Gujarat, India.  It is operated by Rajkot Rajpath Ltd., owned by Rajkot Municipal Corporation.

Plan

Rajkot City Engineer (Special) Vijay Anadkat has planned total of 63 km of Rajkot BRTS, out of which he executed BRTS the first phase during year 2007 to year 2011. In the first phase, 29 km long stretch on 150 feet (46 m) Ring Road would be developed. This stretch would be known as Blue Corridor. The BRTS project is being developed as per National Urban Transport Policy (NUTP) guidelines. The total project cost for the pilot stretch of 10.7 km of Blue Corridor is Rs. 110 Crores.

The funding for the project would come from Jawaharlal Nehru National Urban Renewal Mission (JNNURM). Rajkot falls under cities category B for getting financial assistance from Government of India to implement the project. The funding division for the total project cost will be as: Govt. of India (50%), Govt. of Gujarat (20%), RMC (30%) Ministry of Urban Development,Government of India has already sanctioned Rs. 55 Crores to RMC.

Local authorities plan to purchase state-of-the-art buses. The purchase parameters for the buses would be: CNG fuel, power steering, high speed, non-polluting fuel, modernized engine technology, GPS-based control and communication system and high passenger carrying capacity with comfortable sitting arrangements. The buses will adhere to Urban Bus Specifications published by Ministry of Urban Development and will follow the latest mandate for emission norms of India as per Central Pollution Control Board.
Buses Operational on the Corridor
The BRT bus with the right side doors
BRT Bus and the Station Platform at the same level facilitating ease of boarding alighting.
Bus approaching a station and off-board fare collection at station.
The Identified Corridors

Initially, 10.70 km-long stretch is constructed from Jamnagar crossroad to Gondal crossroad, covering 18 bus stops as part of Blue Corridor. Then, the work on 9.16 km-long stretch from Jamnagar Road to Morbi Road would be taken up. This would be followed by construction of 9.14 km Morbi-Gondal Road stretch, he said.

The next two corridors Green and Red from Arvind Maniyar Nagar to Saurashtra University and Green Land Chowk to Saurashtra University would be taken up at a later stage.

A fleet of 156 luxury buses will run on all the three corridors 70 blue, 25 green and 61 red.

Corridors for BRTS

Blue Corridor (Ring Road) Corridor:

Ring road of the Rajkot city which has 45 m width and which passes through all importance centers of the city has excellent opportunity to reduce the traffic congestion problems and stress.  The length of the ring road is 29.00 km.

Ring road which overlays with National Highways 8 B:

Out of 29.00 km total length of Ring Road about 9.14 km overlaps with National highway 8 B.  The width of road in this section is 60 m.  The development of National highway 8 B is carried out by National Highway Authority under Prime Minister National Highway Development Program.  The work of development of this stretch is at an advance stage of completion. This will be considered in Part-III of BRTS program(Phase-I). However, at the end of phase and start of the BRTS the NH will be used as mixed corridor.

Ring road which passes through Rajkot Urban Development Area:

About 9.16 km of length of ring road falls under RUDA and will be considered as Phase-II of Blue Corridor development.

Ring road which passes through Rajkot Municipal Corporation area:

Out of 29.00 km total length of BRTS, about 10.70 km pass through RMC area and will be developed Part-I of in first Phase of BRTS Program. There are eighteen stations on this part of BRTS section. These are:

Green Corridor (North-South Corridor)

The north–south corridor provides connectivity to residential areas like Press Colony, Radio Colony, Bajarangwadi, Jam Tower area along Jamnagar road and Panchnath temple area, Limda Chowk area, Moti tank area, Rajput para, Bhaktinagar circle, Sorathiya wadi circle, Kothariya road, devparachowk, Arvindbhai maniyar quarter, and Kothariya road and National high way crossing. The corridor also provides connectivity to major hospital like Western railway hospital, Civil Hospital, Janana Hospital and Madhuram Hospital etc. The institutional areas like Choudhury High School, Mohandas Gandhi vidyalaya, Sheth high school etc. are connected to the corridor the length of this corridor is 12.30 – 16.50 km. 11 stations along the corridor
have been identified at the following locations:

Red Corridor (East-West Corridor)

The east–west corridor is of 16.50 km up ward with 12 stations. It starts from Ambedkar Nagar in west on Kalavad Road, passes along Mahila College, Kisanpara junction, Race Course junction, Sadar Bazar, Choudhury High School, Civil Hospital and along Kuvadwa road till Kuvadwa Road-Ring Road junction on the eastern side.

This corridor provides connectivity to development along Kalavad Road area such as Ambedkar Nagar, Sadguru Nagar, Jalaram Society, Swaminarayan temple and residential areas along Sadar Bazar road and Kuvadwa road. The corridor also provides connectivity to institutional areas like Virani science college, Chaudhury high school and public & semi-public institutions such as A.G office, Panchayat office, Police Commissioner's office, Press area, Stock Exchange, Civil Hospital, District Court and Collector's office etc. The length of the Red Corridor is 16.50 km. Total Twelve stations along the corridor have been identified at the following locations:

See More
Rajkot

References

Sources
Rajkot Rajpath qualifies as semi-finalist for International Transport Forum Award 2013 - (http://articles.timesofindia.indiatimes.com/2013-05-08/rajkot/39115569_1_brts-buses-jamnagar-road-chowkdi-gondal-road-chowkdi)
No more free rides in Rajkot BRT now - (http://articles.timesofindia.indiatimes.com/2013-02-20/rajkot/37199846_1_semi-high-floor-ac-buses-jamnagar-road-chowkdi-brts-corridor)
Government of Gujarat gives Rs. 6.90 crores for implementing IT systems in Rajkot BRTS - (http://articles.timesofindia.indiatimes.com/2013-03-19/rajkot/37842705_1_jamnagar-road-chowkdi-brts-corridor-brts-buses)

External links
 Come 2014, BRTS will give city new wheels

Rajkot
Transport in Rajkot
Bus rapid transit in India
2012 establishments in Gujarat